A glory hole is a hole in a wall, or other partition, through which people engage in sexual activity.

Glory hole or gloryhole may also refer to:

Places
 Glory Hole, a colloquial name for the spillway in California's Monticello Dam
 L'îlot de La Boisselle, a site known as Glory Hole to British soldiers during World War I

Technology
 Glory hole (petroleum production), a type of underwater excavation
 Glory hole in glassblowing, a second furnace used for reheating
 Glory hole (mining), a surface depression or pinge produced by block caving
 Glory hole, an uncontrolled spillway design

Music 
 Gloryhole (album), a 1992 album by noise rock band Ed Hall
 "Gloryhole", a 2014 song by Steel Panther

See also
 The Glory Hole (disambiguation)